Tufești is a commune located in Brăila County, Muntenia, Romania. It is composed of a single village, Tufești.

References

Communes in Brăila County
Localities in Muntenia